Derviş Ali Kavazoğlu (April 4, 1924 – April 11, 1965) was a Turkish Cypriot member of the left wing AKEL party who was killed in 1965 by Turkish ultranationalist paramilitary group TMT.

Assassination
Kavazoğlu and Kostas Misiaoulis were proponents of peace between the Turkish Cypriot and Greek Cypriot communities on the island of Cyprus during the period of intercommunal violence. Whilst both were members of AKEL, Misiaoulis was also a PEO trade union official. The two were shot to death on April 11, 1965 when they were ambushed on the Nicosia – Larnaca road, near the village of Goshi. Both are held as symbols of Greek-Turkish solidarity and were commemorated in an event attended by Greek Cypriot President Dimitris Christofias in 2008.

See also
 Fazıl Önder
 Ayhan Hikmet
 AKEL
 İnkılâpçı
 PEO
 TMT
 Cypriot intercommunal violence
- Christakis Vanezos: Derviş Ali Kavazoğlu, Λευκωσία
- Christakis Vanezos: Derviş Ali Kavazoğlu, by Galeri Kultur Yeyinlari, Lefkosa

References

External links

Facebook fan page of Dervis Ali Kavazoglou

1924 births
1965 deaths
Turkish Cypriot politicians
Assassinated Cypriot politicians
Deaths by firearm in Cyprus
People murdered in Cyprus
1960s murders in Cyprus
1965 crimes in Cyprus
1965 murders in Asia
1965 murders in Europe